Maurice is a city in Sioux County, Iowa, United States, along the West Branch of the Floyd River. The population was 265 at the time of the 2020 census. It is home to the "Famous Maurice Fire Escape Slide" in the town park.

History
Maurice was platted in 1882. It was named for Maurice, Prince of Orange. A post office has been in operation in Maurice since 1882.

Geography
Maurice is located at  (42.966226, -96.180848).

Demographics

2010 census
As of the census of 2010, there were 275 people, 102 households, and 81 families residing in the city. The racial makeup of the city was 95.6% White, 0.4% African American, 3.3% from other races, and 0.7% from two or more races. Hispanic or Latino of any race were 5.8% of the population.

There were 102 households, of which 34.3% had children under the age of 18 living with them, 72.5% were married couples living together, 4.9% had a female householder with no husband present, 2.0% had a male householder with no wife present, and 20.6% were non-families. 15.7% of all households were made up of individuals, and 6.9% had someone living alone who was 65 years of age or older. The average household size was 2.70 and the average family size was 3.02.

The median age in the city was 34.6 years. 25.8% of residents were under the age of 18; 10.5% were between the ages of 18 and 24; 23.8% were from 25 to 44; 25.4% were from 45 to 64; and 14.5% were 65 years of age or older. The gender makeup of the city was 52.0% male and 48.0% female.

2000 census
As of the census of 2000, there were 254 people, 95 households, and 76 families residing in the city. The racial makeup of the city was 100.00% White.

There were 95 households, out of which 32.6% had children under the age of 18 living with them, 77.9% were married couples living together, and 20.0% were non-families. 17.9% of all households were made up of individuals, and 10.5% had someone living alone who was 65 years of age or older. The average household size was 2.67 and the average family size was 3.05.

In the city, the population was spread out, with 26.0% under the age of 18, 8.7% from 18 to 24, 24.4% from 25 to 44, 23.2% from 45 to 64, and 17.7% who were 65 years of age or older. The median age was 39 years. For every 100 females, there were 113.4 males. For every 100 females age 18 and over, there were 116.1 males.

The median income for a household in the city was $41,591, and the median income for a family was $41,705. Males had a median income of $30,347 versus $21,250 for females. The per capita income for the city was $15,455. None of the population or families were below the poverty line.

Education
MOC-Floyd Valley Community School District is the local school district. The district formed on July 1, 1994 with the merger of the Maurice-Orange City and Floyd Valley districts.

References

Cities in Iowa
Cities in Sioux County, Iowa